Cyllene lamarcki is a species of sea snail, a marine gastropod mollusk in the family Nassariidae, the Nassa mud snails or dog whelks.

Cernohorsky (1984) considers this as a chrono-subspecies of the Miocene Cyllene desnoyersi (Basterot, 1825)

Description
The length of the shell varies between 10 mm and 17 mm.

The ovate shell is oblong and thick. It is of a bluish white, with distant red spots. The spire is short and pointed. It is composed of five or six indistinct whorls. The suture is simple. These whorls are ornamented with longitudinal folds or ribs, narrow, and regular, finer and closer towards the lip. Upon the body whorl, which is somewhat ventricose, the ribs are slightly arcuated throughout their whole length. They descend quite to the base, and towards that point they are intersected by transverse striae. Similar striae exist at the upper part of the lowest whorl, which is flattened. The aperture is elongated, and dilated in the middle. Its interior is violet colored. The thick outer lip is striated internally.

Distribution
The species occurs in the Atlantic Ocean off Gabon, the Gulf of Guinea and Angola

References

 Bernard, P.A. (Ed.) (1984). Coquillages du Gabon [Shells of Gabon]. Pierre A. Bernard: Libreville, Gabon. 140, 75 plates pp. 
 Gofas, S.; Afonso, J.P.; Brandào, M. (Ed.). (S.a.). Conchas e Moluscos de Angola = Coquillages et Mollusques d'Angola. [Shells and molluscs of Angola]. Universidade Agostinho / Elf Aquitaine Angola: Angola. 140 pp.

External links
 

Nassariidae
Gastropods described in 1825